Nair is a hair-removal product manufactured by Church & Dwight. It was purchased from Carter-Wallace in 2001 via a partnership with Kelso. Also in 2001 Nair introduced its line of men's products. 

Nair is a portmanteau of "No hair." The brand is mainly known for its depilatories that work by breaking the disulfide bonds of the keratin molecules in hair. This reduces the tensile strength of the keratin so greatly that the hair can be wiped away.

Nair's slogans include: "The Less That You Wear the less you have to fix your hair, the More You Need Nair!"; "Like Never Before"; and "We wear short shorts, Nair for short shorts". The initial ad for the "short shorts" commercial won a Clio. It was based on the 1958 song "Short Shorts". 

As of 2007, Nair had 25 products ranging from hair removal waxes to bleaches.

Active ingredients
Calcium hydroxide is an active ingredient that chemically breaks down the hair for removal. Some formulations also contain potassium thioglycolate, which breaks down the disulfide bonds in the hair's keratin. The products often include softening agents, such as mineral oil, to help offset the harsh active ingredients.

References

External links
 Nair
 Nair for Men

Hair removal
Church & Dwight brands
Personal care brands
Carter-Wallace
Products introduced in 2001